Paul Blenck (5 October 1895 – 14 August 1979) was a French racing cyclist. He rode in the 1919 Tour de France.

References

1895 births
1979 deaths
French male cyclists
Place of birth missing